Italy competed at the 1985 Summer Universiade in Kobe, Japan and won 15 medals.

Medals

Details

References

External links
 Universiade (World University Games)
 WORLD STUDENT GAMES (UNIVERSIADE - MEN)
 WORLD STUDENT GAMES (UNIVERSIADE - WOMEN)

1985
1985 in Italian sport
Italy